This is the DG International (Data General International) character set.

Character set

References

Character sets